Dr. Florence Eid-Oakden was the CEO & Chief Economist of Arabia Monitor Research & Strategy, a London-based independent research firm specialising in the economies, markets and geopolitics of the Middle East & North Africa (MENA). Arabia Monitor also focuses on the new silk routes as they impact the MENA region and publishes in Chinese on a daily basis—a niche it dominates unrivalled.

Career
Dr. Eid-Oakden was formerly head of MENA research at JP Morgan, and has subsequently worked with the World Bank on Latin America and North Africa, and also, on the buy side as a hedge fund investment professional. She has been a professor of economics and finance at the American University of Beirut and a visiting professor at INSEAD and HEC Paris.

She currently sits on the Board of Directors of Natixis Saudi Arabia where she serves as chair of the Audit & Risk and Compensation Committees. Previously, she has acted as a member of HSBC’s Middle East Financial System Risk Advisory Committee and, for a period of 9 years (three terms), as a Director of the Arab Banking Corporation International Bank in London, and of Bank ABC Jordan (2 terms).  In addition, Dr. Eid-Oakden has been a Director of Shuaa Capital in Dubai.

Dr. Eid-Oakden is currently a member of the Board of Trustees of the Arab Bankers Association of North America in New York, and is a member of the Advisory Council of the Al Faisal University College of Business, Saudi Arabia, where she also advises the Saudi Government. A few years back, she enjoyed serving as a Trustee of the American University in Paris, where she had completed her undergraduate studies.

Dr. Eid-Oakden received her Ph.D. in Organization Economics from the Massachusetts Institute of Technology (MIT) with a joint MIT-Harvard Doctoral Committee, under the supervision of Bengt Holmström, a Nobel Laureate Professor. She is fluent in English, French, Spanish and Arabic, and has a working knowledge of Italian and Portuguese.

Dr. Eid-Oakden is a regular contributor to Bloomberg News and has appeared on CNN, France24, and The Wall Street Journal.

References

Year of birth missing (living people)
Living people
Lebanese economists
Businesspeople from London
Lebanese women in business
English people of Lebanese descent
MIT School of Humanities, Arts, and Social Sciences alumni